This is a list of  Jamaica's official representatives and their placements at the Big Four international beauty pageants, considered the most important in the world.

The country has won four victories:
 Four  —  Miss World crowns (1963 • 1976 • 1993 • 2019)

Hundreds of beauty pageants are conducted yearly, but the Big Four are considered the most prestigious, widely covered and broadcast by media. The Wall Street Journal, BBC News, CNN, Xinhua News Agency, and global news agencies such as Reuters and Agence France-Presse collectively refer to the four major pageants as "Big Four" namely: Miss Universe, Miss World, Miss International and Miss Earth.

Jamaica's Big Four titleholders
Colour Key

× Did not compete
↑ No pageant held

References

See also
Miss Jamaica Universe
Miss Jamaica World
Miss Earth Jamaica

Nations at beauty pageants